Peter Milne (30 September 1824 – 11 March 1908) was a Scottish violinist and composer. He was known as the "Tarland Minstrel".

Life
He was born in Kincardine O'Neil and taught himself the fiddle in his early teens. He became famous as a player of reels and strathspeys.

He was buried in a pauper's grave in Nellfield Cemetery in Aberdeen in 1908. The Scottish Fiddle College erected a stone to his memory.

Recognition

Milne was mentor to James Scott Skinner  who wrote a Strathspey entitles "Peter Milne".

References

1824 births
1908 deaths
Scottish violinists
British male violinists
Scottish fiddlers
People from Aberdeenshire
Scottish composers
Composers for violin
19th-century British male musicians